Nepka is a settlement in the Sahara Desert in west Algeria near Foumirate.

Geography of Adrar Province